Karen Facemyer (born June 17, 1954) is an American politician who served in the West Virginia House of Delegates from the 12th district from 1992 to 2000 and in the West Virginia Senate from the 4th district from 2000 to 2012.

References

1954 births
Living people
Republican Party members of the West Virginia House of Delegates
Republican Party West Virginia state senators
People from Fort Belvoir, Virginia